Sam Concepcion is the self-titled, first studio album of the teen sensation Sam Concepcion. It was released under Universal Records on early September 2007. The album was certified Gold by the Philippine Association of the Record Industry.

Album information
The album was pre-recorded early in 2007. The album contains 11 tracks. It carries out three lead singles. The first single was Even If which is a revived song from the American boy band 2Be3. The next two single was also released right after Even If. The last single I'll find Your Heart was a hit and even topped the MYX chart. Happy the second single is an original Jackson 5/Michael Jackson. The three lead single was released with a music video.

The song Stay the Same, originally from Joey McIntyre was also included in the album.

Track listing

Certification

I'll Find Your Heart (Music+Videos)

I'll Find Your Heart (Music+Videos) is a repackaged album of Sam Concepcion's first album. It was released under Universal in 2008. The repackaged album contains the three main singles from Concepcion's debut album plus its corresponding videos. "Stay the Same" was also included on the track list.

Track listing

Other information
The first single (Even If) was featured in one of Your Song's episode.

References

External links
Sam Concepcion album lyrics by Sam Concepcion

2007 debut albums
Universal Records (Philippines) albums